The WCPO TV Tower is a free-standing lattice tower with triangular cross section located in Cincinnati, Ohio, and used by WCPO-TV, WEBN, WUBE-FM, WVXU, WBQC-LD, and previously WOTH-CD. Built in 1965 it is the oldest of the Cincinnati's large freestanding radio towers.

Stations

Radio
FM stations that transmit from WCPO TV Tower include the following:

Television
TV stations that transmit from WCPO TV Tower include the following:

See also 
 Lattice tower
 List of tallest freestanding steel structures

References

Lattice towers
Radio masts and towers in Ohio
Buildings and structures in Cincinnati
Towers completed in 1965